Audrey Zarif (born 23 July 1998) is a French table tennis player. Her highest career ITTF ranking was 99.

References

1998 births
Living people
French female table tennis players
20th-century French women
21st-century French women